Boarding House Groonen (German: Pension Groonen) is a 1925 Austrian silent comedy film directed by Robert Wiene and starring Anton Edthofer, Karl Forest and Harry Nestor. It was Wiene's first film in Vienna, where he had moved to from Berlin to work for Pan Film. The film was made in 1924, but its premiere was delayed until 9 January 1925.

Cast
 Anton Edthofer   
 Karl Forest   
 Harry Nestor   
 Claude France   
 Carmen Cartellieri   
 Charlotte Ander   
 Albert Heine

References

Bibliography
 Jung, Uli & Schatzberg, Walter. Beyond Caligari: The Films of Robert Wiene. Berghahn Books, 1999.

External links

1925 films
Austrian silent feature films
Films directed by Robert Wiene
Austrian black-and-white films
Austrian comedy-drama films
1925 comedy-drama films
Silent comedy films